is a Japanese professional footballer who plays as a forward or a winger for Shimizu S-Pulse.

Career statistics

Club

International

References

External links

 Profile at Shimizu S-Pulse

1996 births
Living people
Association football people from Shizuoka Prefecture
Japanese footballers
Association football forwards
Japan international footballers
2019 AFC Asian Cup players
J.League U-22 Selection players
J1 League players
J2 League players
J3 League players
Austrian Football Bundesliga players
Shimizu S-Pulse players
SK Rapid Wien players
Japanese expatriate footballers
Japanese expatriate sportspeople in Austria
Expatriate footballers in Austria